Sigfrido Ranucci (born 24 August 1961) is an Italian journalist, known for directing Fallujah, The Hidden Massacre.

He hosts the well-known Italian investigative TV series Report.

Sigfrido Ranucci is married to Marina and has three children; he's Roman Catholic.

References

Italian journalists
Italian male journalists
Living people
1961 births
Italian Roman Catholics